Espectro (Portuguese for "Specter") is the sixth studio album by Brazilian psychedelic rock band Violeta de Outono, released on May 28, 2012 by Voiceprint Records. It was the band's first release with new drummer José Luiz Dinola.

Track listing

Personnel
 Fabio Golfetti – vocals, guitar
 José Luiz Dinola – drums
 Gabriel Costa – bass
 Fernando Cardoso – keyboards
 Fred Barley – additional percussion (track 10)
 Gabriel Golfetti – ocarina (track 3)
 Alex Angeloni – mixing
 Walter Lima – mastering
 Ruy Galisi – technical assistant
 Victoria Golfetti – inner photo
 Hank Nieman – back cover photo
 Invisível – cover art, design

References

External links
 Espectro at Violeta de Outono's official Bandcamp

2012 albums
Voiceprint Records albums
Violeta de Outono albums
Portuguese-language albums